The 1918 Washington football team was an American football team that represented the University of Washington during the 1918 college football season. In its first season under coach Anthony Savage, the team compiled a 1–1 record and was outscored by its opponents by a combined total of 7 to 6. George Smith was the team captain.

The two games were played after the Armistice was signed on November 11 to end World War I.

Schedule

References

Washington
Washington Huskies football seasons
Washington football